Leonard Jones Basson (born 8 April 1960) is a South African politician, a Member of Parliament (MP) for the Democratic Alliance and the DA's provincial leader in the North West. Before being elected unopposed to this position on 21 November 2020, Basson had served as the deputy provincial leader from 2017 to 2020. He has held various posts in the Official Opposition Shadow Cabinet of South Africa. He served as the Shadow Deputy Minister of Water and Sanitation between 2014 and 2017, as the Shadow Minister of Water and Sanitation from 2017 to 2019, and as the Shadow Minister of Human Settlements, Water and Sanitation from 2019 to 2020. Basson has been the Shadow Minister of Water & Sanitation since 2020.

Background
Basson has been a resident of Brits in the North West since 1976. He is married to Daleen, and they have three children and six grandchildren. Basson served on the governing body of  Pansdrif Primary School for 10 years and was the chairperson for six years. He was also a member of the governing body of Hoërskool Brits for 12 years, serving as the chairperson for nine years.

Political career
Basson is a member of the Democratic Alliance (formerly the Democratic Party). In 1995, he was elected as a councillor for Madibeng. He remained a councillor until his election to the National Assembly in the 2014 general election. The DA parliamentary leader, Mmusi Maimane, appointed him as Shadow Deputy Minister of Water and Sanitation. He was promoted to Shadow Minister of Water and Sanitation in 2017. Also in 2017, Basson was elected as the deputy leader of the DA in the North West. He is also the DA's constituency head of Madibeng.

He was re-elected to Parliament in May 2019. Maimane then appointed him as Shadow Minister for the newly created Human Settlements, Water and Sanitation portfolio.

On 21 November 2020, Basson was elected unopposed as the DA's provincial leader in the North West, succeeding Joe McGluwa, who stood down. In the following days, he was appointed as Shadow Minister of Water and Sanitation by John Steenhuisen.

In April 2021, Basson opposed the deployment of 24 Cuban engineers to assist the Department of Water and Sanitation in addressing South Africa's water crisis and called on Minister Lindiwe Sisulu to reverse the deployment and to rather employ South African engineers.

Following the suspension of former premier Supra Mahumapelo's ANC membership in late-April 2021, Basson said that "the suspension comes more than ten years too late" and that the North West Province "would have been in a better position today if Supra Mahumapelo never happened."

References

External links

Mr Leonard Jones Basson at Parliament of South Africa

Living people
1960 births
Afrikaner people
People from Madibeng Local Municipality
Members of the National Assembly of South Africa
Democratic Alliance (South Africa) politicians